Frank Howard (April 26, 1925 – March 15, 2011) was a Canadian trade unionist and politician.

Life and career
Howard was born in Kimberley, British Columbia. After a career as a logger and labour union organizer, he was elected to the Legislative Assembly of British Columbia as a BC CCF MLA in 1953. He was defeated in 1956 but won a seat in the House of Commons representing Skeena in the 1957 election.

Howard first sat as a member of the Co-operative Commonwealth Federation and then for its successor, the New Democratic Party (NDP). In Parliament, Howard and his caucus colleague Arnold Peters were responsible for reforming Canada's divorce laws, and for achieving significant reforms to Canada's prison system. He was also instrumental in attaining full voting rights for Canadian First Nations.

Howard stood as a candidate in the 1971 NDP leadership convention, finishing fifth. He was a Member of Parliament for seventeen years until he lost his seat in the 1974 general election.

In 1979, Howard returned to politics, running again for the Legislative Assembly of British Columbia. He won that election and served as Skeena's Member of the Legislative Assembly until 1986.

Howard published an autobiography, From Prison to Parliament, in 2003, the title referring to his overcoming a troubled upbringing. Howard's mother worked as a prostitute on the outskirts of Kootenay River Valley, a mining town, while his father was believed to have been her pimp. Involved with petty thievery as a child, a judge determined that he was neglected and sent him to an orphanage at the age of 12 from which he was sent to a succession of foster homes. During World War II, he found work on a Vancouver shipyard then, in 1943, engaged in a month-long crime spree with an accomplice in the summer of 1943, robbing two jewellery stores and a hotel while armed with a revolver. Howard was convicted of three counts of armed robbery and sentenced to two years on each charge, ultimately serving 20 months in the federal penitentiary  before being released on May 1, 1945. After leaving prison he changed his name from Frank Thomas Woodd and found work as a logger, ultimately becoming an organizer for the International Woodworkers of America and serving as president of Local 1-71 for seven years before entering politics in 1952 and then winning his first election in 1953.

Howard died on March 15, 2011, at the age of 85.

Archives 
There is a Frank Howard fonds at Library and Archives Canada. Archival reference number is R3507.

References

External links
 
 From a cellblock to Centre Block Globe and Mail obituary

1925 births
2011 deaths
New Democratic Party MPs
Co-operative Commonwealth Federation MPs
British Columbia New Democratic Party MLAs
British Columbia Co-operative Commonwealth Federation MLAs
20th-century Canadian politicians
Members of the House of Commons of Canada from British Columbia
Trade unionists from British Columbia
Canadian socialists
Canadian loggers
International Woodworkers of America people
Canadian politicians convicted of crimes
People convicted of robbery